Southlands College, also known as Southlands Girls, is a Girls' school located in Galle, Sri Lanka, founded in 1885 by the Wesleyan Methodist missionaries. Southlands College is situated within the historical Galle fort.

Southlands College is the premier Girls school in Southern Sri Lanka. It was started during the British rule in 1885. Lucy Vanderstraaten was the first principal. The school began in two larger down-stair rooms in a house in Fort with a group of some 50 children. It was originally named "Wesleyan Girls School".

History 

Long before Sri Lanka came under Western Rule, education was primarily in the hands of the priests in the village temple. It was the main institution for education. Under Portuguese and Dutch rulers the prevailing system was changed and gradually the church started running elementary schools in villages. When the British took over the administration in the 19th Century several changes were made in the country's education system

"Another important influence that entered the island with British occupation was in the realm of Christian missionary education and religious activity. The liberal attitude toward private missionary activity soon attracted many missions to the Island. All these missionary societies concentrated on education, for this was held to be the key to conversion. The government was content to leave education, in the hands of the mission and to provide them with grants. Besides being economical, it was also the way education was organized in Britain. The British government in Ceylon had no consistent policy on education, and support to the missions depended on the predilections of the Governor. The missions opened and managed their own schools in various parts of the country on funds sent by home organizations." (Arsaratnam, 1964: 154)

"The Chief Justice of Ceylon, Alexander Johnston on a visit to England in 1809 conferred with Wilberforce who recommended Ceylon as a field for a Wesleyan Mission….. The arrival of the first five Methodist Missionaries at Galle [took place in] June 1814 …. In 1884 Government gave up all its English schools except Royal College. The English schools were handed over to the Christian Missions ….The Government Girls High School which was in Galle Fort was handed over to the Methodist Mission." (Roberts, 1993: 117–119)

In 1885 Wesleyan Girls School was opened with a group of 51 pupils in two large class rooms. Miss Lucy Vanderstraaten became the first principal.

As recounted in the Southlands B.M.V Centenary 1885–1985 magazine, Miss Westlake was the tenth principal of the school assuming duties as principal in 1907 and she served the school for eleven years. A new era dawned with her as the principal with many improvements occurring during her period. She travelled to college from the Wesleyan Missionary headquarters at Richmond Hill and is credited with opening up a hostel in a residence at Light House Street in Fort with four pupils and a teacher. She did her best to upgrade the school and to her credit there was a significant expansion of material resources of the school and steady improvement in the quality of education imparted to the students. A science room and a class room for the kindergarten children were newly built by her. The expenses to put up these buildings were met by the government, past pupils, and well wishers.

She was capable of doing all these improvements during her period due to her frugal and efficient management of the school finances. It was during her time in 1914 that the Past Pupils Association was formed. Southlands became the first school to have a Girl Guide Company in Galle. Miss Freethy who was the vice principal during Miss Westlake's era became the principal of the school in 1918 when Miss Westlake left Sri Lanka.

During Miss Freethy's time remarkable changes were done. The foremost of those was renaming the school as SOUTHLANDS in 1922. The name was chosen mainly to honour Miss Westlake for her distinguished work in the school since she had he training at Southlands Methodist College in Wimbledon, England. It is a very happy coincidence because Southlands is the premier Girls school in the South and also one of the oldest girls’ schools in Sri Lanka too.

Today Southlands has become a centre for learning not only in the South but also one of the national educational institutions in the Island.

School story 

During the long period Southlands College developed in the academic field as well as in many 
extra-curricular activities. In addition to the normal primary education of the school, Southlands 
pupils had the privilege of learning music, singing, western and eastern drama, dancing physical 
training and a number of sports as tennis, netball and cricket. Home economics, Needle work, 
Handicraft and Guiding etc. were yet others since all those subjects were introduced to the main 
school curriculum in that era.

1902–1907: Southlands College started her rapid development during the period of Mrs. E. 
Ludovici, a past pupil, a member of the tutorial staff, who rose to be the Principal in 1902. During 
her period Physical Education and Western Music were introduced. A school Library was 
founded to develop the reading habits of the students.

1907–1918: Miss. M. Westlake, the distinguished principal who succeeded Ms. Ludovici, made 
many changes for the further development of the school. A Boarding House was started to help 
the students who came from a far. A Science Laboratory and a Kindergarten unit were also built. 
The Old Pupils Association was inaugurated in 1914 with much enthusiasm to help the school 
and first Galle Guide Company was formed in the school in 1917. A new era dawned in the school 
during the eleven years of her dedicated service.

1918–1935: Miss. Freethy took over the administration in 1918 and rendered her services for 11 
long years being another dedicated missionary. She developed the college in many fields. The 
first school magazine was edited and published to hail the dawn of progress. Since the number of 
pupils increased, hostel facilities were in great demand. During her period, a well wisher of the 
school, Muhandiram Wickramasinghe, very generously donated a building for the hostel in 
memory of his daughters named "Wickramasinghe Hostel". This turned out to be a great asset to 
the school. Rapid development of the school made the Government upgrade the school to a 
secondary school. Along with the change Miss Freethy found a new name to the school too and it 
became Southlands College in 1902. The name was specially chosen to honor Miss. Westlake, the 
much devoted Principal, who had her missionary training at Southlands College, Wimbledon 
before her arrival in Sri Lanka.

We should remember Miss. Freethy for guiding the pupils in qualities of leadership by 
introducing the house system into the school administration. Thus the four houses were born in 
honor of four lady missionaries, Westlake, Wiseman, Hellier and Hunter. In 1927, the school was 
given a much-needed assembly hall, and in 1930 a two-storey building was built 
to widen the hostel facilities in the school premises itself. Thus the "Resteric" hostel which is 
being used by boarders even today was declared open by the Governor of Ceylon, Sir Herbert 
Stanley. The year 1935 became a significant year during Miss. Freethy's period when the school 
celebrated the Golden Jubilee on a very grand scale. The song which was specially composed for 
the jubilee celebrations was made the school song and was sung until the school was vested in the 
Government.

1935–1946, 1950–1956: Miss. Edith Ridge graced Southlands in 1929 as the vice Principal. She 
succeeded Miss. Freethy and completed 20 long years as Principal. A rapid improvement was 
seen during her period when in 1954, she was able to build a two storied building to house the 
increasing number of students seeking admission. a year later, she completed the third storey of the 
building with the assistance given by all pupils and parents, teachers and all well-wishers and 
was declared open in 1956 as the "Ridge Building". It became a "Rich Building" with a large 
number of class rooms, an art room, science laboratory, Principal's quarters and the college 
office. The school developed rapidly during this period which could be considered a golden era of 
the college. The school was able to celebrate the 70th anniversary also in a very grand way during 
her period. She became the most loved Principal of pupils, teachers, parents and all well wishers 
in Southern Sri Lanka.

Much later in 1996, the O.P.A Colombo branch presented a felicitation volume "Golden Heart of 
Southlands" to her on her 96th Birthday in U.K. She was 99 years old when she died on 
11 December 2002.

Development of the school since 1955:

1956–1960: When Miss. Edith Ridge left in 1956 the administration was handed over to the then 
vice principal, Miss. Leila Solomon, a qualified Educationist. Though it was not an easy task to 
succeed a Principal of that caliber, Miss. Solomon however was able to maintain the high 
standard of education in the school by introducing more changes to the school curriculum and 
administration. The Advanced Level Arts stream was introduced during her time. She encouraged 
all extra-curricular activities. The Guide Company and Brownie pack were revived. She 
succeeded in organizing a Parent-Teacher Association in 1958 which was of immense help to the 
school. She tried to educate the child through modern Technology, Audio Visual media being 
introduced into teaching in her time. She also tried to improve the quality of education by 
introducing General Knowledge competitions, Spelling contests and many other competitive 
activities. Library reading was made compulsory to improve the reading habit. She left in 1960 on 
a government scholarship to USA being the last missionary Principal of Southlands. Miss 
Solomon departed from us on the 29rh of October 2001.

1960–1962: This is considered an important period in the history of the school. The school was 
on the verge of being vested in Government and Miss. Queeni Abeywardena, loyal past pupil and 
devoted teacher for many years was appointed as the acting Principal for a short period. On fifth 
March 1962, Southlands College was vested in the Government according to the new educational 
policy. It saw the end of a memorable era and missionary management of the school. Miss. Q. 
Abeywardena retired from service as the last Christian Principal of Southlands.

1962–1972: Southlands became a government school and Mrs. Rupa Nanayakkara was appointed 
the firth Principal after the take over. She rendered valuable service for over 10 years as a devoted 
Principal who tried to develop the school in numerous ways. Advanced Level Science classes 
were introduced to pave the path for students to enter Medical College. She tried to develop the

skills of the student and all extra curricular activities were reintroduced. Along with the change of 
administration a new school song was composed replacing the old one.

The western Band and Oriental Orchestra were started. To encourage the Advanced Level Home 
Science students, a new Home science room was built. The most significant event during her era 
was that for the first time in the history of Southlands, an all night Pirith Ceremony was held 
followed by an alms giving the merit of which was bestowed on all past Principals, teachers and 
well wishers who had helped to make Southlands a major Educational Institute in the Southern 
Province. During Mrs. Nanayakkara's period the government commemorated the Educational 
Centenerary and Southlands College too celebrated it in a grand way. Special attention was given 
to English education with assistance given by devoted teachers such as Miss. Ludovici to improve 
the knowledge of the English language of the student. Fine Arts were revived and Mrs. 
Nanayakkara too encouraged producing many Sinhala stage drama with the assistance given by 
Mr. Herman Perera, keeping the old tradition of the school alive. For the first time in the School's 
history Southlands was fortunate enough to bring "Kusa Jathkaya" the stage drama on the boards 
at Lumbini Theatre to a full house.

During Mrs. Nanayakkara's period the number of students who sought admission to the school 
increased rapidly and the accommodation was not enough to house the Primary and Upper school 
together. Even though it was not a good solution, the primary classes were conducted in the 
afternoon due to lack of accommodation.

She rendered 10 years of devoted service to the upgrading of the school and left having been 
appointed Principal of Ananda Balika Vidyalaya, Colombo.

1972–1976: Mrs. L. Gunasingha succeeded Mrs. Nanayakkara and during her short period she 
helped to improve the standard of the school. The school was now endowed with a new two 
storied building. The school Hewisi Band was formed, the aesthetic unit improved and children 
participated in several all-island competitions. Guiding activities was revived and a Southlands 
student was fortunate enough to participate in the World Guiding Jamboree in U.S.A. 
representing Sri Lanka. She helped to inaugurate a branch of the National Savings Bank in the 
school.

1976–1991: Another memorable period dawned when an experienced teacher Mrs. Daniel, 
assumed duties as Principal and devoted her services for 15 long years for the betterment of the 
school. During her time many significant events occurred and Southlands College became 
popular due to continued academic achievement. The major event during this time was the 
upgrading of the school to an "A" grade one and being further promoted as one of the eighteen 
national schools in the Island in 1984. The student population increased and the school needed 
more accommodation to house the students comfortably. Thus a new two storied building was 
constructed. "Volanka" another large building adjoining the school was bought with the financial 
assistance given by renowned southern philanthropist Mr. B.R. Dissanayaka in memory of wife 
Kathleen Balage ho was a past pupil of the school.

The building was renamed as "Dissanayaka Building". The primary school children who were 
studying in the afternoon session for lack of accommodation had the privilege of having the best 
of facilities in modern class rooms again in the morning from 1984.

The Buddhist atmosphere pervading the school during Mrs. Nanayakkara's time was enhanced 
further when Mrs. Daniel did her best to construct a Buddhist shrine room for the benefit of

Buddhist children who comprised the majority of students to observe religious activities before 
the school began. A school co-operative society was established which is functioning well even 
today and a Teachers’ Guild too were formed during this period.

Southlands College completed 100 years of service in the field of education during Mrs. Daniel's 
time and the school celebrated the centenary in a very grand way. A very valuable school 
magazine was published tracing the history of the school with the assistance of pupils and 
devoted teachers.

Remarkable progress was made in the academic field as well as in all other activities during her 
15 years of devoted service and Southlands College gained popularity in Southern Sri Lanka. 
Mrs. Daniel retired from education service in 1991 after imparting valuable service to the great 
development of the school and leaving an indelible mark in the history of the school.

1991–1995: Mrs. K. Rajapaksa became the Principal in 1991. During her short stay the school 
was able to own a bus to provide traveling facilities to the student through the efforts of the OGA 
as one of their projects. Karate was introduced to the school curriculum and a building which was 
nearing completion was finished and declared open during her time.

1995–1999: Mrs. N. Kumarasinghe a devoted staff member who served the school for a number 
of years was appointed as the Principal in 1995. She made arrangements to build a modern 
auditorium for the college as the present assembly hall could not accommodate the increasing 
student population. She encouraged the present students to sing the old English school 
hymn full of valuable gems of advice every morning at assembly Special attempt was made to 
improve the quality of English knowledge of the student. Educational indoor games were 
encouraged and most valuable historical school magazine "First decade of the second century" 
was published. Mrs. Kumarasinghe retired in 1995 having rendered valuable service for many 
years at Southlands.

1999–2006 Mrs. Leelakanthi Gunawardena, a past pupil who was a member of the staff for 
many years assumed office in 1999. She became the third past pupil who had the privilege of 
being the principal of Southlands. During her time there had been many admirable and academic 
records in the school in all fields The most memorable achievement in the academic history was 
when one of the students won the first place in the All Island Advanced Level Examination in 
1999 in the Commerce Stream. This record was maintained in the following year when yet 
another student was able to gain this place again in the same examination in 2000 in the Arts 
stream Such performance of academic excellence seem to be pursued by emerging generations 
when the second and third places at ordinary level Examinations were secured by Southlands in 2003

In year 2002 a modern auditorium was handed over to the school by the Ministry of Education. 
The "Resteric" hostel which was 70 years old was renovated with the assistance of the Education 
Ministry and reopened to help accommodate the students who attend school from distant 
localities. Mrs. H L T Gunawardena left the school after getting a promotion as the ADE of 
Science and Maths in the Southern Province

2006–2007: Mrs. P A D Suneetha became the principal in 2006. During her short stay in 
school, she paid her attention in improving the quality of English in school. English camps, 
Singing assemblies were held for each and every grade. Mrs. P A D Suneetha left the school 
after getting a transfer to Horana Sripalee Vidyalaya

2007–We should be happy to have a devoted past pupil; Mrs Geethani Wijegunasinghe 
as the present principal. The Advanced Level Bio-laboratory which was closed for some years 
was renovated and reopened for the use of the Students. For guiding the students in qualities of 
leadership she introduced the ‘Junior Prefects’ in to the school administration. These Junior 
Prefects were selected from the grade nine classes.

School crest and motto 

School Crest

School crest appears firstly on the outer cover page of the Diamond college magazine (1885–1945) during the period of Miss Edith Ridge.

After the school was vested in the Government the crest was changed. The Letter in the centre of the crest was changed and instead of the letter ‘S’ the Sinhala letter ‘SA’ was installed on the centre of the crest (1962–1976).

During the other periods no difference is visible in the crest but we could see an evolution of the crest at different times. The crest was printed in red on many magazines and printed matter before 1976 but after 1977 red and silver colours had been used for the crest. For the first time we come across the crest and the motto together in the magazine published in 1956. The significant feature found in this magazine is that the Sinhalese words are indicated on the top of the crest and the English wordings had been printed at the bottom. This becomes more important since this had been done by the Principals during a period under Methodist missionary management.

After 1977 and up to now the English motto ‘Knit together in love and service’ is indicated on the crest but the Sinhalese words had been omitted.

School Motto

Motto is a short list of words meant formally to describe the general motivation of any organization, designed to serve a purpose. A motto is often depicted on the crest.
First and foremost we come across the school motto on the outer cover page of the magazine May 1924 Vol. IV No 3 and on the 18th & 19th pages of the same magazine we find a description of the school motto for the first time along with an account of an O.P.A. dinner. It is an exceptionally significant incident to note and mention that a school motto had been used in both languages English and Sinhalese in an English medium school administered by foreign Missionaries during the period under British rule.

Past principals

Notable alumni
Anoma Sooriyaarachchi – Sri Lankan track and field athlete

References

External links
 Southlands College, Galle

1885 establishments in Ceylon
Educational institutions established in 1885
Former Methodist schools in Sri Lanka
Girls' schools in Sri Lanka
National schools in Sri Lanka
Schools in Galle